SPINFED is a state undertaking in Rajasthan. It a federation of cooperative spinning mills of Rajasthan. It came into existence on 1 April 1993.

Function
It is founded to plan and implement cotton programmes in co-operative sector of Rajasthan. It also aims at insuring quality cotton yarn.

Mills under Spinfed
Under Spinfed total 4 mills are working, as follows:-
1 Rajasthan co-operative Spinning mills ltd. Gulabpura, District Bhilwara.
2 Gangapur co-operative Spinning mills ltd. Gangapur, District Bhilwara.311801
3 Gulabpura Ginning and  Pressing Sahkari Samiti ltd. Gulabpura, District Bhilwara
4 Ganganagar Sahkari Spinning  Samiti ltd. Hanumangarh, District Hunumangarh

References
rajspinfed.com – Official website
Rajasthan Spinfed makes growth,
Retrieved from The Hindu Newspaper.

Cotton mills
Economy of Rajasthan
State agencies of Rajasthan
Bhilwara district
Textile companies of India
Cotton industry in India